The Delaware Confederate Monument is a private monument in Georgetown, Delaware built on the grounds of the Georgetown Historical Society, unveiled in 2007.

The granite monument features a Confederate battle flag and the names of more than 95 Delawareans, both soldiers and civilians, who supported the Confederate war effort, including former Delaware Governor William H. H. Ross.

See also
 List of Confederate monuments and memorials

References

2007 sculptures
Buildings and structures in Georgetown, Delaware
Confederate States of America monuments and memorials
Monuments and memorials in Delaware
2007 establishments in Delaware